The High Commission of Eswatini in London is the diplomatic mission of Eswatini in the United Kingdom.

The High Commission is housed in a building designed by Reginald Blomfield in the late 19th century and features sculpture-work by Henry Pegram.

A regular protest has been held since 2010 each Saturday by those opposed to the rule of King Mswati III.

References

External links
Images of the building
History and photos of the building

Eswatini
Diplomatic missions of Eswatini
Eswatini–United Kingdom relations
Grade II listed buildings in the City of Westminster
Reginald Blomfield buildings